Landy Margarita Berzunza Novelo (born 5 July 1965) is a Mexican politician affiliated with the PRI. She currently serves as Deputy of the LXII Legislature of the Mexican Congress representing Campeche.

References

1965 births
Living people
Politicians from Campeche City
Women members of the Chamber of Deputies (Mexico)
Institutional Revolutionary Party politicians
21st-century Mexican politicians
21st-century Mexican women politicians
Members of the Congress of Campeche
Deputies of the LXII Legislature of Mexico
Members of the Chamber of Deputies (Mexico) for Campeche